This is a list of moths of the subfamily Arctiinae that are found in South Africa. It also acts as an index to the species articles and forms part of the full List of moths of South Africa.

Acantharctia latifasciata Hampson, 1909
Acantharctia vittata Aurivillius, 1900
Afrasura ichorina (Butler, 1877)
Afrasura obliterata (Walker, 1864)
Afrasura rivulosa (Walker, 1854)
Afrospilarctia dissimilis (Distant, 1897)
Afrospilarctia flavida (Bartel, 1903)
Aglossosia flavimarginata Hampson, 1900
Alpenus auriculatus Watson, 1988
Alpenus maculosa (Stoll, 1781)
Alpenus nigropunctata (Bethune-Baker, 1908)
Alpenus whalleyi Watson, 1988
Amata alicia (Butler, 1876)
Amata atricornis (Wallengren, 1863)
Amata cerbera (Linnaeus, 1764)
Amata cuprizonata (Hampson, 1901)
Amata endocrocis (Hampson, 1903)
Amata johanna (Butler, 1876)
Amata kuhlweini (Lefèbvre, 1832)
Amata polidamon (Cramer, 1779)
Amata rendalli (Distant, 1897)
Amata simplex (Walker, 1854)
Amerila affinis (Rothschild, 1910)
Amerila bauri Möschler, 1884
Amerila bipartita (Rothschild, 1910)
Amerila lupia (Druce, 1887)
Amerila madagascariensis (Boisduval, 1847)
Amerila magnifica (Rothschild, 1910)
Amerila phaedra Weymer, 1892
Amerila vitrea Plötz, 1880
Amphicallia bellatrix (Dalman, 1823)
Amsacta melanogastra (Holland, 1897)
Amsacta nivea Hampson, 1916
Anaphosia aurantiaca Hampson, 1909
Apisa canescens Walker, 1855
Archilema uelleburgensis (Strand, 1912)
Argina amanda (Boisduval, 1847)
Argina astrea (Drury, 1773)
Argina leonina (Walker, 1865)
Asparus bicolor (Walker, 1855)
Asura doa Kühne, 2007
Asura sagenaria (Wallengren, 1860)
Asura thumataeformis Strand, 1912
Automolis bicolora (Walker, 1856)
Automolis crassa (Felder, 1874)
Automolis incensa (Walker, 1864)
Automolis meteus (Stoll, 1781)
Automolis pallida (Hampson, 1901)
Binna penicillata Walker, 1865
Binna scita (Walker, 1865)
Cacosoma gnatula (Boisduval, 1847)
Carcinopodia argentata (Distant, 1897)
Caryatis hersilia Druce, 1887
Ceryx anthraciformis (Wallengren, 1860)
Ceryx longipes (Herrich-Schäffer, 1855)
Ceryx resecta (Herrich-Schäffer, 1855)
Ceryx toxotes Hampson, 1898
Coscinia aethiopica Kühne, 2010
Cragia distigmata (Hampson, 1901)
Cragia quadrinotata (Walker, 1864)
Creatonotos punctivitta (Walker, 1854)
Ctenosia psectriphora (Distant, 1899)
Cyana capensis (Hampson, 1903)
Cyana marshalli (Hampson, 1900)
Cyana pretoriae (Distant, 1897)
Cyana rejecta (Walker, 1854)
Cyana rhodostriata (Hampson, 1914)
Cymaroa grisea (Thunberg, 1784)
Dasyarctia grisea Gaede, 1923
Didymonyx infumata (Hampson, 1900)
Dionychoscelis venata Aurivillius, 1922
Diota rostrata (Wallengren, 1860)
Eilema achrosis Hampson, 1918
Eilema albostriatum Kühne, 2010
Eilema bifasciata Hampson, 1900
Eilema brunneotincta Rothschild, 1912
Eilema caffrana Strand, 1912
Eilema colon Möschler, 1872
Eilema creatoplaga (Hampson, 1901)
Eilema discifera (Hampson, 1900)
Eilema elegans (Butler, 1877)
Eilema flavibasis Hampson, 1900
Eilema gainsfordi Kühne, 2010
Eilema goniophora Hampson, 1900
Eilema gracilipennis (Wallengren, 1860)
Eilema leia (Hampson, 1901)
Eilema minutissima Bethune-Baker, 1911
Eilema monochroma (Holland, 1893)
Eilema phaeopera Hampson, 1900
Eilema pustulata Wallengren, 1860
Eilema sarceola Hampson, 1900
Eilema trichopteroides Kühne, 2010
Eilema vicara Strand, 1922
Eilema virgineola Hampson, 1900
Epitoxis amazoula (Boisduval, 1847)
Epitoxis nigra Hampson, 1903
Estigmene angustipennis (Walker, 1855)
Estigmene internigralis Hampson, 1905
Estigmene multivittata Rothschild, 1910
Estigmene trivitta (Walker, 1855)
Euchromia amoena (Möschler, 1872)
Euchromia folletii (Guérin-Méneville, 1832)
Euchromia lethe (Fabricius, 1775)
Euchromia madagascariensis (Boisduval, 1833)
Eucreagra arculifera Felder, 1874
Eugoa africana Hampson, 1900
Eurosia fuliginea Hampson, 1903
Eurosia lineata Hampson, 1900
Eurozonosia inconstans (Butler, 1896)
Eutomis minceus (Stoll, 1781)
Exilisia bipuncta (Hampson, 1900)
Eyralpenus diplosticta (Hampson, 1900)
Eyralpenus meinhofi (Bartel, 1903)
Eyralpenus sublutea (Bartel, 1903)
Eyralpenus testacea (Walker, 1855)
Galtara doriae (Oberthür, 1880)
Galtara doriae (Oberthür, 1880)
Galtara nepheloptera (Hampson, 1910)
Galtara pulverata (Hampson, 1900)
Galtara purata Walker, 1863
Hypagoptera rufeola Hampson, 1900
Ilemodes astriga Hampson, 1916
Ilemodes heterogyna Hampson, 1900
Karschiola holoclera (Karsch, 1894)
Lamprosiella eborella (Boisduval, 1847)
Lepista aposema Kühne, 2010
Lepista pandula (Boisduval, 1847)
Lepista semiochracea (Felder, 1874)
Leucaloa eugraphica (Walker, 1865)
Logunovium scortillum Wallengren, 1875
Lysceia bigutta Walker, 1854
Macrosia chalybeata Hampson, 1901
Macrosia fumeola (Walker, 1854)
Metarctia benitensis Holland, 1893
Metarctia brunneipennis Hering, 1932
Metarctia burra (Schaus & Clements, 1893)
Metarctia cinnamomea (Wallengren, 1860)
Metarctia confederationis Kiriakoff, 1961
Metarctia dracoena (Kiriakoff, 1953)
Metarctia jansei (Kiriakoff, 1957)
Metarctia lateritia Herrich-Schäffer, 1855
Metarctia lindemannae Kiriakoff, 1961
Metarctia paremphares Holland, 1893
Metarctia rubra (Walker, 1856)
Metarctia rufescens Walker, 1855
Metarctia saalfeldi Kiriakoff, 1960
Metarctia transvaalica (Kiriakoff, 1973)
Micralarctia punctulatum (Wallengren, 1860)
Micrilema craushayi Hampson, 1903
Neuroxena obscurascens (Strand, 1909)
Nyctemera apicalis (Walker, 1854)
Nyctemera leuconoe Hopffer, 1857
Ochrota bipuncta (Hampson, 1900)
Ochrota unicolor (Hopffer, 1857)
Opsaroa fulvinota Hampson, 1905
Ovenna simulans (Mabille, 1878)
Ovenna subgriseola (Strand, 1912)
Ovenna vicaria (Walker, 1854)
Paralacydes arborifera (Butler, 1875)
Paralacydes bomfordi (Pinhey, 1968)
Paralacydes jeskei (Grünberg, 1911)
Paralacydes ramosa (Hampson, 1907)
Paralacydes vocula (Stoll, 1790)
Paralpenus strigulosa (Hampson, 1901)
Paramaenas affinis (Rothschild, 1933)
Paramaenas nephelistis (Hampson, 1907)
Paramaenas strigosus Grünberg, 1911
Paraona interjecta Strand, 1912
Pareuchaetes aurata (Butler, 1875)
Pareuchaetes pseudoinsulata Rego Barros, 1956
Pasteosia irrorata Hampson, 1900
Pasteosia plumbea Hampson, 1900
Paurophleps minuta Hampson, 1900
Phlyctaenogastra rangei Gaede, 1915
Phragmatobia parvula (Felder, 1874)
Phryganopsis asperatella (Walker, 1864)
Phryganopsis atrescens Hampson, 1903
Phryganopsis cinerella (Wallengren, 1860)
Phryganopsis continentalis Kühne, 2010
Phryganopsis gilvapatagia Kühne, 2010
Phryganopsis interstiteola Hampson, 1914
Phryganopsis plumosa Mabille, 1900
Phryganopsis punctilineata (Hampson, 1901)
Phryganopsis sordida Felder, 1874
Phryganopsis subasperatella Strand, 1912
Phryganopsis tenuisparsa Kühne, 2010
Popoudina dorsalis (Walker, 1855)
Popoudina griseipennis (Bartel, 1903)
Popoudina lemniscata (Distant, 1898)
Popoudina linea (Walker, 1855)
Pseudonaclia puella (Boisduval, 1847)
Pusiola flavicosta (Wallengren, 1860)
Pusiola verulama (Strand, 1912)
Radiarctia lutescens (Walker, 1854)
Radiarctia rhodesiana (Hampson, 1900)
Rhodogastria amasis (Cramer, 1779)
Rhodogastria similis (Möschler, 1884)
Saenura flava Wallengren, 1860
Secusio deilemera Talbot, 1929
Secusio discoidalis Talbot, 1929
Secusio strigata Walker, 1854
Setina atroradiata Walker, 1865
Seydelia ellioti (Butler, 1895)
Siccia atriguttata Hampson, 1909
Siccia caffra Walker, 1854
Siccia melanospila Hampson, 1911
Siccia punctipennis (Wallengren, 1860)
Siccia pustulata (Wallengren, 1860)
Sozusa despecta (Walker, 1862)
Sozusa heterocera Walker, 1865
Sozusa montana Kühne, 2010
Sozusa scutellata (Wallengren, 1860)
Sozusa triangulata Kühne, 2010
Spilosoma bipartita Rothschild, 1933
Spilosoma butti (Rothschild, 1910)
Spilosoma chionea (Hampson, 1900)
Spilosoma euryphlebia (Hampson, 1903)
Spilosoma gynephaea (Hampson, 1901)
Spilosoma immaculata Bartel, 1903
Spilosoma latiradiata (Hampson, 1901)
Spilosoma leighi (Rothschild, 1910)
Spilosoma lentifasciata (Hampson, 1916)
Spilosoma lineata Walker, 1855
Teracotona euprepia Hampson, 1900
Teracotona metaxantha Hampson, 1909
Teracotona pardalina Bartel, 1903
Teracotona rhodophaea (Walker, 1865)
Teracotona submacula (Walker, 1855)
Thumatha inconstans (Butler, 1897)
Thyretes caffra Wallengren, 1863
Thyretes hippotes (Cramer, 1780)
Thyretes montana Boisduval, 1847
Trichaeta fulvescens (Walker, 1854)
Trichaeta pterophorina (Mabille, 1892)
Utetheisa elata (Fabricius, 1798)
Utetheisa lotrix (Cramer, 1779)
Utetheisa pulchella (Linnaeus, 1758)
Zadadrina metallica Kiriakoff, 1954
Zobida avifex Kühne, 2010

Arctiinae
 South Africa